Searlesite is a sodium borosilicate mineral, with the chemical formula NaBSi2O5(OH)2. It was discovered in 1914 at Searles Lake, California, and was named to honor John W. Searles (16 November 1828 - 7 October 1897), California pioneer, who drilled the well that yielded the first known Searlesite.

Searlesite is usually found disseminated in fine-grained lacustrine strata and often associated with altering volcanic ash.  It may be a minor component of borate deposits, but it is rarely found concentrated or in megascopic crystals and so has not been developed as an ore mineral of boron.  It occurs interbedded with oil shales or marls (Green River Formation, US) and in boron-bearing evaporite deposits (California, US); rarely in vugs in phonolite (Point of Rocks, New Mexico).

References

Mindata, with localities
Webmineral
Searlesite

Borate minerals
Phyllosilicates
Monoclinic minerals
Minerals in space group 4
Searles Valley
Geology of Inyo County, California
Borosilicates